Urban Utilities (UU) is the trading name of the Central SEQ Distributor-Retailer Authority, a statutory authority of the Government of Queensland that is responsible for the delivery of retail water supply and wastewater services across five local government areas in South East Queensland, in Australia. The shareholders of the statutory authority are the councils of Brisbane, Ipswich, Lockyer Valley, Scenic Rim, and Somerset.

Function and activities
The authority was formed of 1 July 2010 when it assumed the functions of Brisbane Water, a government business enterprise that was owned and managed by the Brisbane City Council, together with the merging of water assets from the four other member local government authorities. At the time, the 4.3 billion merger was the largest water transaction and second largest infrastructure transaction in Australian history.

UU services over a quarter of Queensland's total population.

Related organisations are Unitywater (Moreton Bay, Sunshine Coast and Noosa), Logan City Council (Logan Water), Redland City Council (Redland Water), and Gold Coast City Council.  Allconnex Water supplied Logan, Redland and Gold Coast, until 30 June 2012.

See also

 Queensland Water Commission
 Seqwater
 Water security in Australia
 Water supply and sanitation in Australia

References

External links
 Official website

Water companies of Queensland
Water management in Queensland
Government agencies of Queensland
Government agencies established in 2010
2010 establishments in Australia
South East Queensland